Rajib Dutta (born 17 November 1980) is an Indian former cricketer. He played 49 first-class matches for Tripura between 1999 and 2011. Dutta played in Tripura's first five first-class victories, captaining the side in four of them. He now coaches the team.

References

External links
 

1980 births
Living people
Indian cricketers
Tripura cricketers
People from Agartala
Cricketers from Tripura
Indian cricket coaches